Deutsche Ost-Afrika Linie (German East Africa Line) was a shipping line, established in 1890 as an alternative to the existing shipping services to East Africa, including German East Africa (1891–1919), then dominated by United Kingdom shipping lines.

Founding
In 1888, the board of the trading firm Woermann-Linie made plans to set up a scheduled service to East Africa as the existing routes were dominated by British lines. The following year the Reichstag approved such a shipping line and in January 1890 the Chancellor began looking for a German shipping company to set up a line to Africa subsidized for over ten years with 900,000 marks a year. As no company was ready, the Reich announced the establishment of a shipping company. On April 19, 1890, the Deutsche Ost-Afrika Linie was founded with a capital of six million marks by a consortium of German banks and the Hamburg merchants Adolph Woermann, F.Laeisz, August Bolten, and Hansen & Co. C. Woermann took over the management with Adolph Woermann as Chairman of the Supervisory Board. The line began operating on July 23, 1890 with two steamers purchased from the Woermann line. Beginning in 1891, the service consisted of weekly departures from Hamburg via the Mediterranean to Bombay-Zanzibar.

Early years
The first years of operation were quite difficult due to the British takeover of Zanzibar in November 1890 and the loss of two ships in the first three years. By 1894, the routes were extended to South Africa and profits were posted for the first time. In 1900 the government contract with annual subsidies of 1.35 million marks was extended by 15 years and the share capital increased to ten million marks. In 1901, a bond for five million marks was issued to build more ships.

In 1894 the company added a route from Hamburg to Durban in South Africa via the Cape and commissioned for this service the "Herzog" (1896/4,933 gt) and the "Koenig". In 1895 DOAL introduced instead the new steamers on the route Hamburg - Suez - Dar es Salaam and from 1898 also Durban was connected via Suez, no longer via Cape Town, in order to avoid a clash with the British. Only from 1901, when the Boer War was no longer a political obstacle, a new 'Rund-um-Afrika' (round Africa) route was operated by DOAL on the circuit Hamburg - Bremerhaven - Cape Town - Suez - Hamburg and in reverse direction. For this main line the 'Kronprinz' and 'Kurfürst' were introduced, steamers with a grey hull, white superstructure and a buff funnel, topped with an arrangement of black/white/red rings, pointing the national colours.

More difficult years followed until 1907, as new competitors appeared and the British lines increased competition. The Deutsche Ost-Afrika Linie and the Woermann Line then responded to an offer by Albert Ballin to form a joint venture with Hamburg-America Line (HAPAG). HAPAG and Woermann participated in the operation of the Deutsche Ost-Afrika Linie and each allocated one or two ships for an extension of the line from South Africa to West Africa. The Woermann Line was involved in the shared service and in 1908 the Hamburg-Bremen Africa Line also joined. The increased number of departures improved business.
 
After the death of Adolph Woermann in 1911, Eduard Woermann succeeded him. In 1914 the company's fleet consisted of 22 steamers, with approx. 110,000 BRT.

World War One and its aftermath

The subsidy contract of 1900, which expired in 1915, was not extended as a result of the war. In 1916 Woermann sold the Woermann Line and the Deutsche Ost-Afrika Linie to a consortium made up of HAPAG, Norddeutscher Lloyd (NDL) and Hugo Stinnes. The company lost all ships due to the First World War and the Versailles Treaty.
 
The Stinnes shares were taken over by HAPAG and NDL in 1921.
 
In 1927 the Deutschen Afrika-Dienst-Vertrag of 1907 was continued for a further 20 years and in the following years the corporate structure stabilised. In 1928 the 9,552-ton "Watussi" and "Ubena" were introduced as the first two-funnel turbine steamers of the company sporting the DOAL label, employed on the 'Rund-um-Afrika' route.

A year after the NSDAP Nazi Party seized power, German shipping was reorganized in 1934, in which the large shipping groups were divided. HAPAG and Norddeutscher Lloyd had to surrender their shares in the Woermann Line and the Deutsche Ost-Afrika Linie to the German Reich. In 1936 two larger turbine steamers were launched, the "Pretoria" and the "Windhuk" of 16,662 tons each.

In 1942, during World War II, this line and the Woermann-Linie owned by the cigarette manufacturer Philipp Fürchtegott Reemtsma, were taken over by John T. Essberger of Nazi Germany. The Deutsche Afrika-Linien lost both fleets in post-war reparations.

Ships of the Deutsche Ost-Afrika Linie up until 1914

Ships of the Deutsche Ost-Afrika Linie after 1914

See also
 Deutsche Afrika-Linien/John T. Essberger Group of Companies
 
 
 Kenya Colony

References

External links

 

Defunct shipping companies
Shipping companies of Germany
East Africa
German East Africa
Companies based in Hamburg
Transport companies established in 1890
Transport companies disestablished in 1942
1890 establishments in Germany
1942 disestablishments in Germany
1890 establishments in German East Africa
1890 establishments in Africa
1940s disestablishments in Africa
Defunct companies of Germany